The 2001 Malé League is the first season of the Malé League.

League table

References
 Maldives 2001, Malé League at RSSSF

Football leagues in the Maldives
Maldives
Maldives
1